Theodore Rhodes (November 9, 1913 – July 4, 1969) was an American professional golfer who helped to break the color barrier in the sport.

Rhodes was born in Nashville, Tennessee and attended the city's public schools. He learned the game of golf in his teenage years while working as a caddie at Nashville's Belle Meade Country Club and Richland Country Club. In the late 1930s, Rhodes joined the Civilian Conservation Corps (CCC). He served in the United States Navy in World War II. When his tour of duty concluded, Rhodes was discharged in Chicago, where he met entertainer Billy Eckstine and heavyweight boxing champion Joe Louis. He taught both men to play the game of golf, and served as Louis' personal instructor, valet and playing partner.

Golf career
In the late 1940s, Rhodes moved to southern California where he was mentored by Ray Mangrum. In 1948, he played in the U.S. Open at the Riviera Country Club in Los Angeles, California and became recognized as the first African-American professional golfer. Rhodes and fellow African-American golfer Bill Spiller initiated litigation against the Professional Golfers' Association of America (PGA) seeking removal of the association's "Caucasian only clause". Although they prevailed in the out-of-court settlement, the PGA circumvented the agreement by changing its tournaments to "invitationals" and invited only whites to participate.

Rhodes played mostly in United Golf Association sanctioned tournaments during his career, winning about 150 times. Courses he played included Rogers Park, Tampa.

Rhodes returned to his native Nashville in the 1960s and mentored several black PGA players including Lee Elder and Charlie Sifford. He died at the age of 55. A month after his death, the Cumberland Golf Course in Nashville was renamed in his honor and is now named Ted Rhodes Golf Course.  In 1998, Rhodes was inducted into the Tennessee Golf Hall of Fame.

In 2009, the PGA of America granted posthumous membership to Rhodes, Spiller, and John Shippen. The PGA also has granted posthumous honorary membership to boxer Joe Louis. During his first Masters win speech, Tiger Woods mentioned Rhodes as one of the pioneers that paved the way for him to play golf. In 2010, Rhodes was inducted into the Tennessee Sports Hall of Fame.

The Ted Rhodes Foundation was created in 1993 to keep his legacy alive and educate others about his contributions to the game of golf by hosting golf tournaments for youth and adults, as well as golf clinics. The foundation is run by Rhodes's granddaughter Tiffany White. The foundation supports HBCUs (historically black colleges and universities) golf teams, such as Fisk University's in Nashville, and gives scholarships to HBCU golf team members. Lastly, the foundation supports urban junior golf programs, such as First Tee of Tennessee and First Tee of Lake County.

References

External links
[tedrhodes.org Ted Rhodes Foundation]

American male golfers
African-American golfers
Golfers from Tennessee
Civilian Conservation Corps people
Sportspeople from Nashville, Tennessee
1913 births
1969 deaths
20th-century African-American sportspeople